Anisantherina is a genus of flowering plants belonging to the family Orobanchaceae.

Its native range is Southeastern Mexico to Tropical America.

Species:

Anisantherina hispidula

References

Orobanchaceae
Orobanchaceae genera